Jamie Borger (born 28 May 1964) is a Swedish drummer who has played in the bands Talisman, Treat and Last Autumn's Dream. Over the years, he also has recorded with Alfonzetti, Adam Thompson, Baltimore, Human Clay, Swedish Erotica and Jeff Scott Soto.

He also be involved several unreleased groups like The Three Kings with Jeff Scott Soto and Swedish guitar player Goran Elmquist. A couple of their demos ("As I Do To You" and "This Ain't the Love") were used by Jeff Scott Soto on his Believe in Me E.P.

His musical influences include: Mick Tucker, Ian Paice, Bobby Rondinelli and Jeff Porcaro.

He is sponsored by Sonor Drums and Zildjian.

Discography

with Talisman
 Humanimal Part II - 1994
 Humanimal - 1994
 Five out of Five (Live in Japan) - 1994
 Life - 1995
 Best of... (compilation, different from above) - 1996
 BESTerious (compilation) - 1996
 Truth - 1998
 Cats and Dogs - 2003
 Five Men Live - 2005
 7 - 2006

CD singles edited with Talisman

 All + All (CD single)  (1994)
 Todo y Todo (CD single) (All + All Latin American market release under nickname Genaro) (1994)
 Colour My XTC (CD single) (1994)
 Doing Time With My Baby (CD single)  (1994)
 Frozen (CD single) (1995)
 Crazy (CD single) (1998)

with Last Autumn's Dream
 2005 - II
 2006 - Winter in Paradise
 2007 - Saturn Skyline
 2007 - Impressions: The Very Best of LAD (Japanese market)
 2007 - Hunting Shadows
 2008 - Live in Germany 2007
 2008 - Impressions: The Very Best of LAD (German market)
 2009 - Dreamcatcher

with Treat
 1987 - Dreamhunter
 1989 - Treat (UK compilation)
 1989 - Organized Crime
 1992 - Treat
 2006 - Weapons of Choice 1984-2006
 2008 - Scratch and Bite (Remaster) + Live at FireFest DVD
 2010 - Coup De Grace
 2016 - Ghost of Graceland

with Human Clay
 1997 - u4ia
 2005 - Closing the Book (remaster)

with Jeff Scott Soto 
 2002 - Believe in Me E.P.
 2004 - Lost in the Translation
 2006 - Essential Ballads
 2012 - Damage Control

with Alfonzetti
2000 - Ready
2002 - Machine

with Swedish Erotica
1985 - Blindman's Justice

with Baltimoore
1992 - Double Density

Other recordings
 2000 - Various Artist - A Tribute to Grand Funk Railroad

Endorsement
Sonor Delite Series,
Brilliant Champagne Finish:
 14" x 5" Snare Drum,Wood Shell
 12" x 9" Tom Tom
 14" x 14" Floor Tom
 16" x 16" Floor Tom
 22" x 17" Bass Drum
 
Zildjian Cymbals:
 10" A Custom Splash
 19" A Custom Crash
 14" Oriental China Trash
 14" A Master Sound Hi-Hat
 12" A Custom Splash
 18" A Custom Projection Crash
 22" K Dark Ride
 18" Oriental China
 19" A Custom Crash
 18" A Custom Crash
 20" A Custom Crash
 
Drumheads:
Snare: Remo Emperor Coated
Toms: Remo Emperor Smooth White
Kick:  Remo Powerstroke 3 Clear
 
Sonor 600 Series Hardware

Sonor Giant Step Double Pedal
Sticks: Zildjian Super 5B

References

External links 
 Jamie Borger's official site
 Myspace Page

Living people
Talisman (band) members
Swedish heavy metal drummers
1964 births
Musicians from Stockholm
Last Autumn's Dream members
Treat (band) members
Baltimoore members